Tirando is a method of plucking used in classical guitar and flamenco guitar.  Tirando is Spanish for "pulling" (in English, it is also called a "free stroke").  After plucking, the finger does not touch the string that is next lowest in pitch (physically higher) on the guitar, as it does with apoyando.

Classical guitar
Flamenco
Guitar performance techniques
Spanish classical guitar

ru:Гитара#Звукоизвлечение